Nonachiparu (ml; നൊണച്ചിപ്പാറു) is an Indian soap opera which launched on Asianet channel by 5 September 2016. Actress Sana Althaf plays the lead role in the series.

The show airs every Monday to Friday 10 PM IST. It replaced the popular game show Sell Me the Answer.

This series ended up in 2 months, it was abruptly stopped and was replaced by 2nd part of TV series Vellanakalude Naadu on 21 November 2016.

Plot
Parvathy has the knack of fooling anyone and make them believe her lies. This habit of lying had irrevocably destroyed her life and how she has to now face the consequences.

Cast 
Sana Althaf as Parvathy a.k.a. Paaru
 Valsala Menon as Karinkanni Madhavi
Master munna as chottu
 Kottayam Rashid as C.I.Chandrahasan Police officer
 Devi Chandana as Chandrika
 Amrita as Lakshmi
 Ambarish as Kannan
Mithun as Hareendran
Niranjana Bimal as Catherine
Kannur Sreelatha as Hareendran's Mother
Manka Mahesh

References 

Indian television series
Asianet (TV channel) original programming
Indian television soap operas
Serial drama television series
2016 Indian television series debuts
Malayalam-language television shows
Indian drama television series